Lopatyn is an urban-type settlement in Chervonohrad Raion of Lviv Oblast in Ukraine. It is located on the left bank of the Ostrivka, a left tributary of the Styr in the drainage basin of the Dnieper. Lopatyn hosts the administration of Lopatyn settlement hromada, one of the hromadas of Ukraine. Population: 

Until 18 July 2020, Lopatyn belonged to Radekhiv Raion. The raion was abolished in July 2020 as part of the administrative reform of Ukraine, which reduced the number of raions of Lviv Oblast to seven. The area of Radekhiv Raion was merged into Chervonohrad Raion.

Economy

Transportation

The settlement is connected by local roads with Radekhiv, Brody, Busk, and Berestechko, where it has further access via national roads to Lviv, Rivne, and Lutsk.

References

Urban-type settlements in Chervonohrad Raion